Eudorylas is a genus of flies in the family Pipunculidae.

Species
Eudorylas abdominalis (Loew, 1858)
Eudorylas aberratus (Hardy & Knowlton, 1939)
Eudorylas ablus (Hardy, 1954)
Eudorylas abnorexitus Morakote & Yano, 1990
Eudorylas abnormalis Rafael & Menezes, 1999
Eudorylas abruptus (Hardy, 1952)
Eudorylas absonditus (Hardy, 1954)
Eudorylas accedens (Hardy, 1954)
Eudorylas acroacanthus (Hardy, 1968)
Eudorylas acroapex (Hardy, 1962)
Eudorylas aculeatus (Loew, 1858)
Eudorylas adunatus (Hardy, 1965)
Eudorylas aduncus Dunk, 1995
Eudorylas aemulus (Hardy, 1949)
Eudorylas aequus (Cresson, 1911)
Eudorylas aethiopicus (Hardy, 1949)
Eudorylas affinis (Cresson, 1910)
Eudorylas albinervis Kuznetzov, 1990
Eudorylas albucus (Hardy, 1968)
Eudorylas alternatus (Cresson, 1910)
Eudorylas amanii Földvári, 2003
Eudorylas amitinus (Hardy, 1962)
Eudorylas amurensis Kuznetzov, 1990
Eudorylas amuscarium (Hardy, 1960)
Eudorylas anaclastus Skevington, 2003
Eudorylas andinus Rafael, 1991
Eudorylas anfractus Skevington, 2003
Eudorylas angustimembranus Kozánek, 1991
Eudorylas angustipennis (Kertész, 1903)
Eudorylas angustus (Hardy, 1952)
Eudorylas anomalus (Hardy, 1968)
Eudorylas antennalis Kapoor, Grewal & Sharma, 1987
Eudorylas antillensis (Rafael, 1996)
Eudorylas apicalis (Hardy & Knowlton, 1939)
Eudorylas apiculatus (Hardy, 1961)
Eudorylas appendiculatus Kozánek, 1991
Eudorylas aptus (Hardy, 1972)
Eudorylas aquavicinus (Hardy, 1943)
Eudorylas aquinoi Rafael, 1990
Eudorylas arcanus Coe, 1966
Eudorylas argryofrons (Hardy & Knowlton, 1939)
Eudorylas arthurianus (Tonnoir, 1925)
Eudorylas arundani (Hardy, 1954)
Eudorylas arvazensis Kuznetzov, 1994
Eudorylas ashoroensis Morakote & Yano, 1990
Eudorylas atratus (Meijere, 1914)
Eudorylas atrigonius Huo & Yang, 2010
Eudorylas attenuatus (Yang & Xu, 1989)
Eudorylas auctus Kehlmaier, 2005
Eudorylas avid Motamedinia & Skevington, 2020
Eudorylas barkalovi Kuznetzov, 1990
Eudorylas barrettoi (Hardy, 1965)
Eudorylas bartaki Kozánek, 1993
Eudorylas barueriensis (Hardy, 1965)
Eudorylas beckeri (Kertész, 1903)
Eudorylas beiyue Yang & Xu, 1998
Eudorylas bentoni Rafael, 1990
Eudorylas bermeri Kehlmaier, 2005
Eudorylas bharatiensis Kapoor, Grewal & Sharma, 1987
Eudorylas bicolor (Becker, 1924)
Eudorylas bicostalis Kapoor, Grewal & Sharma, 1987
Eudorylas bidactylus (Hardy, 1943)
Eudorylas bihamatus Motamedinia & Skevington, 2020
Eudorylas bilobatus Shi, Hu & Yang, 2019
Eudorylas bilobus (Hardy, 1947)
Eudorylas bipertitus Kehlmaier, 2005
Eudorylas biroi (Kertész, 1903)
Eudorylas bisetosus (Hardy, 1962)
Eudorylas blascoi De Meyer, 1997
Eudorylas boliviensis (Rafael, 1991)
Eudorylas bredoi (Hardy, 1949)
Eudorylas brevisalus Morakote & Yano, 1990
Eudorylas brunnipennis (Becker, 1900)
Eudorylas bulbosus Rafael, 1995
Eudorylas burmanicus (Hardy, 1972)
Eudorylas buscki (Malloch, 1912)
Eudorylas caccabatus Rafael, 1990
Eudorylas caledonicus Ackland, 1999
Eudorylas carpathicus Kozánek, 1993
Eudorylas caudatus (Cresson, 1910)
Eudorylas cernuus Skevington, 2003
Eudorylas chilensis (Rafael, 1991)
Eudorylas chvalai Kozánek, 1988
Eudorylas ciliatus (Meijere, 1907)
Eudorylas cinerascens (Perkins, 1905)
Eudorylas clausum Skevington, 2003
Eudorylas coei Kehlmaier, 2005
Eudorylas collinus Skevington, 2003
Eudorylas coloratus (Becker, 1897)
Eudorylas comparatus (Hardy, 1972)
Eudorylas concavus Yang & Xu, 1998
Eudorylas concolor (Rafael, 1991)
Eudorylas conformis (Hardy, 1959)
Eudorylas consimilis Rafael, 1989
Eudorylas corbetti Kapoor, Grewal & Sharma, 1987
Eudorylas cordatus Skevington, 2003
Eudorylas corniculans Motamedinia & Skevington, 2020
Eudorylas cornutus (Rafael, 1996)
Eudorylas costalis (Becker, 1924)
Eudorylas cralimes Morakote & Yano, 1990
Eudorylas crassus (Bezzi, 1926)
Eudorylas cressoni (Johnson, 1919)
Eudorylas cupreiventris (Becker, 1914)
Eudorylas curtus (Hardy, 1943)
Eudorylas curvatus (Hardy, 1954)
Eudorylas curvicaudatus Rafael, 1996
Eudorylas cuspicornis (Kertész, 1915)
Eudorylas cycnus Morakote & Yano, 1990
Eudorylas dactylus Skevington, 2003
Eudorylas deansi (Tonnoir, 1925)
Eudorylas deceptor (Hardy, 1968)
Eudorylas decorus (Hardy, 1950)
Eudorylas definitus (Hardy, 1961)
Eudorylas delfinadoae (Hardy, 1972)
Eudorylas demeyeri Kozánek, 1993
Eudorylas denotatus (Hardy, 1960)
Eudorylas devius (Hardy, 1965)
Eudorylas dextratus (Hardy, 1965)
Eudorylas dextrostylus Kapoor, Grewal & Sharma, 1987
Eudorylas diagonalis Morakote & Yano, 1990
Eudorylas dichopticus Kuznetzov, 1990
Eudorylas dicranus Huo & Yang, 2010
Eudorylas digitatus Yang & Xu, 1998
Eudorylas discretus (Hardy, 1952)
Eudorylas disgregus (Hardy, 1965)
Eudorylas diversus (Hardy, 1949)
Eudorylas dives (Hardy, 1947)
Eudorylas dominicanensis Rafael, 1996
Eudorylas dominicensis (Scarbrough & Knutson, 1989)
Eudorylas dorsispinosus (Hardy, 1965)
Eudorylas dreisbachi (Hardy, 1948)
Eudorylas duckei Rafael, 1995
Eudorylas dumicolus (Hardy, 1962)
Eudorylas duocollis Morakote & Yano, 1990
Eudorylas duplicatus Rafael, 1995
Eudorylas echinatus Rafael & Menezes, 1999
Eudorylas elephas (Becker, 1897)
Eudorylas encerus (Hardy, 1949)
Eudorylas ephippium Skevington, 2003
Eudorylas eremitus (Hardy, 1954)
Eudorylas eremnoptera (Hardy, 1962)
Eudorylas euciliatus Kapoor, Grewal & Sharma, 1987
Eudorylas eulentiger Kapoor, Grewal & Sharma, 1987
Eudorylas evanidus (Hardy, 1949)
Eudorylas excisus (Hardy, 1949)
Eudorylas expletirubus Morakote & Yano, 1990
Eudorylas extensus (Brunetti, 1923)
Eudorylas facetus (Hardy, 1962)
Eudorylas falcatus (Hardy, 1949)
Eudorylas falcifer De Meyer, 1997
Eudorylas falx Rafael & Menezes, 1999
Eudorylas fascipes (Zetterstedt, 1844)
Eudorylas filicornis (Brunetti, 1912)
Eudorylas flavicornis (Williston, 1892)
Eudorylas flavicrus De Meyer, 1995
Eudorylas flavitarsis (Williston, 1892)
Eudorylas flavitibia (Rafael, 1991)
Eudorylas flexus (Hardy, 1949)
Eudorylas fluviatilis (Becker, 1900)
Eudorylas focus Morakote & Yano, 1990
Eudorylas fortis Rafael, 1995
Eudorylas fractus (Hardy, 1962)
Eudorylas fritzi (Rafael, 1991)
Eudorylas fujianensis Xu, 2003
Eudorylas fukushimaensis Morakote & Yano, 1990
Eudorylas fumipennis (Kertész, 1903)
Eudorylas furvulus Collin, 1956
Eudorylas fuscipennis (Brunetti, 1927)
Eudorylas fuscipes (Zetterstedt, 1844)
Eudorylas fuscitarsis (Adams, 1903)
Eudorylas fuscitibia (Rafael, 1991)
Eudorylas fusculus (Zetterstedt, 1844)
Eudorylas fustis Morakote & Yano, 1990
Eudorylas galeatus (Hardy, 1949)
Eudorylas garambensis (Hardy, 1961)
Eudorylas garhwalensis Kapoor, Grewal & Sharma, 1987
Eudorylas gemellus Kehlmaier, 2005
Eudorylas ghesquierei (Hardy, 1950)
Eudorylas gilvipes Morakote & Yano, 1990
Eudorylas globosus Yang & Xu, 1998
Eudorylas goennersdorfensis Dempewolf & Dunk, 1996
Eudorylas golbachi (Hardy, 1965)
Eudorylas gomesi (Hardy, 1954)
Eudorylas gorodkovi Kuznetzov, 1990
Eudorylas grandis (Hardy, 1943)
Eudorylas gratiosus (Kertész, 1915)
Eudorylas gressitti (Hardy, 1956)
Eudorylas hadrosoma (Hardy, 1962)
Eudorylas hamatus Skevington, 2003
Eudorylas hardyi (Yang & Xu, 1989)
Eudorylas harmstoni (Hardy & Knowlton, 1939)
Eudorylas harrisi (Tonnoir, 1925)
Eudorylas hasanicus Kuznetzov, 1990
Eudorylas hokkaidoensis Morakote & Yano, 1990
Eudorylas huachucanus (Hardy, 1943)
Eudorylas hystricosus Skevington, 2003
Eudorylas ibericus Kehlmaier, 2005
Eudorylas imbricatus Rafael, 1995
Eudorylas incisus Rafael, 1993
Eudorylas indiaensis Kapoor, Grewal & Sharma, 1987
Eudorylas indivisus (Hardy, 1972)
Eudorylas industrius (Knab, 1915)
Eudorylas inferus Collin, 1956
Eudorylas inopsicolor Morakote & Yano, 1990
Eudorylas inornatus (Hardy, 1949)
Eudorylas insignis (Hardy, 1954)
Eudorylas jacksoni Kapoor, Grewal & Sharma, 1987
Eudorylas jakuticus Kuznetzov, 1990
Eudorylas janae Kozánek, 1991
Eudorylas javanensis (Meijere, 1907)
Eudorylas jenkinsoni Coe, 1966
Eudorylas jesoensis (Matsumura, 1915)
Eudorylas johnenae Dempewolf, 1996
Eudorylas kansensis (Hardy, 1940)
Eudorylas kaszabi Kozánek, 1992
Eudorylas kataplisso Kehlmaier, 2005
Eudorylas katonae (Kertész, 1907)
Eudorylas kerzhneri Kuznetzov, 1990
Eudorylas khaziarensis Kapoor, Grewal & Sharma, 1987
Eudorylas kondarensis Kuznetzov, 1990
Eudorylas kovaljovi Kuznetzov, 1990
Eudorylas kowarzi (Becker, 1898)
Eudorylas kozaneki De Meyer, 1993
Eudorylas lamellatus (Collin, 1941)
Eudorylas largexitus Morakote & Yano, 1990
Eudorylas lasiofemoratus (Hardy & Knowlton, 1939)
Eudorylas latipennis (Banks, 1915)
Eudorylas latistomachus Morakote & Yano, 1990
Eudorylas lautus (Hardy, 1943)
Eudorylas lentiger (Kertész, 1912)
Eudorylas lepus (Rafael, 1991)
Eudorylas liberia (Curran, 1929)
Eudorylas libratus (Hardy, 1949)
Eudorylas ligo Morakote & Yano, 1990
Eudorylas lividus (Hardy, 1954)
Eudorylas loewii (Kertész, 1900)
Eudorylas longicornis Yang & Xu, 1998
Eudorylas longifrons Coe, 1966
Eudorylas longipilus (Hardy, 1948)
Eudorylas longispinus Yang & Xu, 1998
Eudorylas longistigmus Morakote & Yano, 1990
Eudorylas longus Rafael, 1995
Eudorylas lopesi (Hardy, 1954)
Eudorylas ludhianaensis Kapoor, Grewal & Sharma, 1987
Eudorylas luteipes (Brunetti, 1923)
Eudorylas luteiventris Morakote & Yano, 1990
Eudorylas luteolus (Hardy, 1972)
Eudorylas luteopilus (Hardy, 1962)
Eudorylas macrocercus Rafael, 1997
Eudorylas maesi Rafael, 2004
Eudorylas major (Brunetti, 1923)
Eudorylas malaisei (Hardy, 1972)
Eudorylas maleficus Morakote & Yano, 1990
Eudorylas mallee Skevington, 2003
Eudorylas manaliensis Kapoor, Grewal & Sharma, 1987
Eudorylas manasi Kehlmaier, 2011
Eudorylas maurus Rafael, 1991
Eudorylas mediterraneus De Meyer & Ackland, 1997
Eudorylas megacanthus (Hardy, 1961)
Eudorylas megacephalus (Kertész, 1912)
Eudorylas megasurstylus Rafael, 1990
Eudorylas melanotrichus Rafael, 1995
Eudorylas meniscatus Yang & Xu, 1998
Eudorylas meristus Skevington, 2003
Eudorylas meruensis (Hardy, 1949)
Eudorylas mexicanus (Hardy, 1949)
Eudorylas michiganensis (Hardy, 1948)
Eudorylas mikenensis (Hardy, 1950)
Eudorylas minghlanii Kapoor, Grewal & Sharma, 1987
Eudorylas minor (Cresson, 1911)
Eudorylas minutus Morakote & Yano, 1990
Eudorylas minymerus (Hardy, 1962)
Eudorylas misericors Morakote & Yano, 1990
Eudorylas modestus (Haliday, 1833)
Eudorylas modicus (Hardy, 1949)
Eudorylas moffattensis Skevington, 2003
Eudorylas monegrensis De Meyer, 1997
Eudorylas mongolorum Kuznetzov, 1990
Eudorylas montanus (Meijere, 1914)
Eudorylas montium (Becker, 1897)
Eudorylas moragai Rafael & Menezes, 1999
Eudorylas muiri (Hardy, 1972)
Eudorylas mutillatus (Loew, 1858)
Eudorylas nasicus Motamedinia & Skevington, 2020
Eudorylas nasus Morakote & Yano, 1990
Eudorylas natalensis (Hardy, 1949)
Eudorylas nataliae Kuznetzov, 1990
Eudorylas neimongolanus (Xu & Yang, 1991)
Eudorylas nemoralis Kozánek, 1993
Eudorylas nevadaensis (Hardy, 1943)
Eudorylas nigellus Rafael, 1991
Eudorylas nigripes (Loew, 1866)
Eudorylas ningxiaensis Yang & Xu, 1998
Eudorylas nomurai Morakote & Yano, 1990
Eudorylas nudus (Kertész, 1912)
Eudorylas obliquus Coe, 1966
Eudorylas obscurus Coe, 1966
Eudorylas occultus (Hardy, 1950)
Eudorylas ocularis (Matsumura, 1915)
Eudorylas odontophorus Rafael, 1995
Eudorylas okalii Kozánek, 2004
Eudorylas opinatus (Hardy, 1950)
Eudorylas opiparus (Hardy, 1954)
Eudorylas optabilis Kuznetzov, 1990
Eudorylas orthogoninus (Yang & Xu, 1989)
Eudorylas oscen Morakote & Yano, 1990
Eudorylas oshimaensis Morakote & Yano, 1990
Eudorylas oxianus Kuznetzov, 1990
Eudorylas pachymerus Rafael, 1989
Eudorylas pallidiventris (Meijere, 1914)
Eudorylas pamirorum Kuznetzov, 1990
Eudorylas pannonicus (Becker, 1897)
Eudorylas paraappendiculatus Kozánek, Suh & Kwon, 2004
Eudorylas paranaensis Rafael, 1995
Eudorylas pardus Kuznetzov, 1990
Eudorylas parens Kuznetzov, 1990
Eudorylas parilis (Hardy, 1972)
Eudorylas partitus (Hardy, 1965)
Eudorylas parvifrons (Loew, 1858)
Eudorylas parvulus (Wulp, 1898)
Eudorylas pectitibialis (Hardy, 1954)
Eudorylas penai Rafael, 1995
Eudorylas pennatus Kapoor, Grewal & Sharma, 1987
Eudorylas petalus Skevington, 2003
Eudorylas phallophylax Rafael, 1995
Eudorylas phatnomus (Hardy, 1968)
Eudorylas pilosus (Rafael, 1996)
Eudorylas pinjorensis Kapoor, Grewal & Sharma, 1987
Eudorylas pinquis Morakote & Yano, 1990
Eudorylas piriformis (Xu & Yang, 1991)
Eudorylas platyapodemalis Rafael, 2004
Eudorylas platytarsis (Kertész, 1912)
Eudorylas poantaensis Kapoor, Grewal & Sharma, 1987
Eudorylas pondolandi Földvári, 2003
Eudorylas porrectus (Hardy, 1949)
Eudorylas posticus (Collin, 1931)
Eudorylas productus Morakote & Yano, 1990
Eudorylas pusillus (Hardy, 1949)
Eudorylas quadratus (Hardy, 1949)
Eudorylas quadrifidus Rafael, 1995
Eudorylas quartarius (Brunetti, 1912)
Eudorylas quinquepertitus Kehlmaier, 2005
Eudorylas rectinervis (Collin, 1941)
Eudorylas regalis (Curran, 1928)
Eudorylas remiformis (Hardy, 1962)
Eudorylas remotus (Hardy, 1972)
Eudorylas restrictus Coe, 1966
Eudorylas revolutus (Yang & Xu, 1989)
Eudorylas rubidus (Hardy, 1948)
Eudorylas rubrus (Hardy, 1950)
Eudorylas rudis Morakote & Yano, 1990
Eudorylas rurestris Kuznetzov, 1990
Eudorylas rusticus Kuznetzov, 1990
Eudorylas sabroskyi (Hardy, 1943)
Eudorylas sauteri (Kertész, 1907)
Eudorylas scharffi Földvári, 2003
Eudorylas schreiteri (Shannon, 1927)
Eudorylas scissus (Hardy, 1972)
Eudorylas scotinus (Collin, 1931)
Eudorylas scutellatus Kapoor, Grewal & Sharma, 1987
Eudorylas semicircularis Xu, 2003
Eudorylas semiopacus (Lamb, 1922)
Eudorylas separatus (Kertész, 1915)
Eudorylas serratus Rafael & Menezes, 1999
Eudorylas setiformis (Hardy, 1949)
Eudorylas sherloukensis Kuznetzov, 1990
Eudorylas similis (Hardy, 1950)
Eudorylas simulator (Collin, 1931)
Eudorylas sinuosus (Hardy, 1949)
Eudorylas slovacus Kozánek, 1993
Eudorylas soccatus Kuznetzov, 1990
Eudorylas souzalopesi Rafael, 1990
Eudorylas spinosus (Hardy, 1948)
Eudorylas stackelbergi Kuznetzov, 1990
Eudorylas stainsi (Hardy, 1943)
Eudorylas stigmaticus (Malloch, 1912)
Eudorylas straeleni (Janssens, 1955)
Eudorylas subfascipes Collin, 1956
Eudorylas subjectus (Collin, 1931)
Eudorylas subligo Morakote & Yano, 1990
Eudorylas subopacus (Loew, 1866)
Eudorylas subterminalis Collin, 1956
Eudorylas subtilis (Hardy, 1943)
Eudorylas subvaralis (Hardy, 1972)
Eudorylas subvexus Rafael, 2004
Eudorylas sulcatus (Becker, 1897)
Eudorylas suwai Morakote & Yano, 1990
Eudorylas swanengi Földvári, 2003
Eudorylas tadzhikorum Kuznetzov, 1990
Eudorylas tanasijtshuki Kuznetzov, 1990
Eudorylas tanycerus Rafael, 1991
Eudorylas tanzaniensis Földvári, 2003
Eudorylas tarsalis (Banks, 1911)
Eudorylas terminalis (Thomson, 1870)
Eudorylas terraboensis Rafael, 1995
Eudorylas tibiatus Kapoor, Grewal & Sharma, 1987
Eudorylas titanus Kuznetzov, 1990
Eudorylas totoflavus (Hardy, 1972)
Eudorylas trapezoides (Becker, 1900)
Eudorylas triangularis Kehlmaier, 2005
Eudorylas trichosubepandrialis Rafael, 2004
Eudorylas trigonus (Becker, 1921)
Eudorylas tropidoapex (Hardy, 1965)
Eudorylas tshatkalensis Kuznetzov, 1990
Eudorylas tshuki Kuznetzov, 1990
Eudorylas tuberculatus Kapoor, Grewal & Sharma, 1987
Eudorylas tucumanus (Shannon, 1927)
Eudorylas turneri (Hardy, 1949)
Eudorylas uki Kuznetzov, 1990
Eudorylas umbrinus (Loew, 1858)
Eudorylas unanimus (Hardy, 1949)
Eudorylas unicolor (Zetterstedt, 1844)
Eudorylas venezuelensis Rafael, 1995
Eudorylas venturai Kehlmaier, 2005
Eudorylas vicarius (Hardy, 1949)
Eudorylas vicinus Kozánek, 1992
Eudorylas vidali Rafael, 1995
Eudorylas vierecki (Malloch, 1912)
Eudorylas vineti Dempewolf, 1996
Eudorylas vonderdunki Dempewolf, 1998
Eudorylas wahisi De Meyer, 1997
Eudorylas willistoni (Kertész, 1900)
Eudorylas wittei (Hardy, 1950)
Eudorylas wygodzinskyi Rafael, 1995
Eudorylas youngi (Rafael, 1996)
Eudorylas yunnanensis Yang & Xu, 1998
Eudorylas zaitzevi Kuznetzov, 1993
Eudorylas zanclus Rafael, 1993
Eudorylas zermattensis (Becker, 1897)
Eudorylas zonatus (Zetterstedt, 1849)
Eudorylas zonellus Collin, 1956

References

Pipunculidae
Brachycera genera
Diptera of Europe
Diptera of Asia
Diptera of South America
Diptera of North America
Diptera of Africa
Diptera of Australasia